The Morelos Open is a professional tennis tournament played on outdoor hard courts. It is currently part of the ATP Challenger Tour and the International Tennis Federation (ITF) Women's Circuit. It is held annually in Cuernavaca, Mexico.

Past finals

Men's singles

Men's doubles

Women's singles

Women's doubles

External links

 
ATP Challenger Tour
ITF Women's World Tennis Tour
Hard court tennis tournaments
Tennis tournaments in Mexico
Recurring sporting events established in 2014